Salford City Council is the local authority of the City of Salford  in Greater Manchester, England. It is a metropolitan borough council, one of ten in Greater Manchester and one of 36 in the metropolitan counties of England, and provides the majority of local government services in Salford. It is a constituent council of the Greater Manchester Combined Authority.

The directly elected mayor is Paul Dennett and the civic mayor for 2021-2022 is John Mullen.

The council is based at Salford Civic Centre with additional offices in Eccles.

Some services, including property, highways and infrastructure, planning and building control were provided by Urban Vision, a public-private partnership formed in 2005 between SCC, Capita and Galliford Try. Services returned to the council after the contract with Urban Vision finished on 31 January 2020.

Political composition

Since 1973 political control of the council has been held by the Labour Party.

Wards & councillors 

Each ward is represented by three councillors.

References

External links 
 Salford City Council

Local authorities in Greater Manchester
Mayor and cabinet executives
Billing authorities in England
Local education authorities in England
Metropolitan district councils of England
City Council